Akatyevo is the name of several rural localities in Russia:
Akatyevo, Altai Krai, a selo in Nizhneneninsky Selsoviet of Soltonsky District in Altai Krai; 
Akatyevo, Klinsky District, Moscow Oblast, a village under the administrative jurisdiction of the Town of Klin in Klinsky District of Moscow Oblast; 
Akatyevo, Kolomensky District, Moscow Oblast, a selo in Akatyevskoye Rural Settlement of Kolomensky District in Moscow Oblast; 
Akatyevo, Vologda Oblast, a village in Bechevinsky Selsoviet of Belozersky District in Vologda Oblast